Winifred Birkett (1897–1966) was an Australian novelist and poet who won the 1934 Australian Literature Society Gold Medal for her 1935 novel Earth's Quality.

Life and career 
Winifred Birkett was born in North Sydney, New South Wales in 1897, and educated at Sydney Church of England Grammar School. 
Her book, Earth's Quality was published by Angus and Robertson in 1935.
She was president of the Sydney Lyceum Club in 1940. She remained in Sydney much of her life.

Bibliography

Novels

 Three Goats on a Bender (1934)
 Earth's Quality (1935)
 Portrait of Lucy (1938)

Poetry
 Edelweiss, and Other Poems (1932)

Quotes 
Sonnet: "Forget me slowly dear. Let each day lie," Winifred Birkett, poetry 1930 (The Australia Woman's Mirror page 15).

References

1897 births
1966 deaths
Australian women novelists
Australian poets
Writers from Sydney
ALS Gold Medal winners